Mark Fleming may refer to:

 Mark Fleming (footballer) (born 1969), English footballer
 Mark Fleming (wrestler) (born 1960), American wrestler